The Miami Marlins' 2021 season was the 29th season for the Major League Baseball (MLB) franchise in the National League and the 10th as the "Miami" Marlins. The Marlins played their home games at LoanDepot Park as members of the National League East Division. The Marlins did not qualify for the playoffs, finishing fourth in their division with a 67–95 record.

Regular season

Season standings

Record vs. opponents

Game log

|- style="background:#fbb;"
| 1 || April 1 || Rays || 0–1 || Thompson (1–0) || García (0–1) || Castillo (1) || 7,062 || 0–1 || L1
|- style="background:#fbb;"
| 2 || April 2 || Rays || 4–6 || Kittredge (1–0) || Bass (0–1) || Castillo (2) || 6,115 || 0–2 || L2
|- style="background:#bfb;"
| 3 || April 3 || Rays || 12–7 || Bleier (1–0) || Archer (0–1) || — || 6,179 || 1–2 || W1
|- style="background:#fbb;"
| 4 || April 5 || Cardinals || 1–4 || Ponce de Leon (1–0) || Rogers (0–1) || Reyes (1) || 4,609 || 1–3 || L1
|- style="background:#fbb;"
| 5 || April 6 || Cardinals || 2–4 || Helsley (1–0) || Alcántara (0–1) || Reyes (2) || 4,982 || 1–4 || L2
|- style="background:#fbb;"
| 6 || April 7 || Cardinals || 0–7 || Flaherty (1–0) || López (0–1) || — || 5,244 || 1–5 || L3
|- style="background:#fbb;"
| 7 || April 8 || @ Mets || 2–3 || Díaz (1–0) || Bass (0–2) || — || 8,492 || 1–6 || L4
|- style="background:#bfb;"
| 8 || April 10 || @ Mets || 3–0 || Rogers (1–1) || deGrom (0–1) || García (1) || 8,419 || 2–6 || W1
|- style="background:#bbb;"
| – || April 11 || @ Mets || colspan=7 | Suspended (rain, continuation date: August 31)
|- style="background:#bfb;"
| 9 || April 12 || @ Braves || 5–3  || García (1–1) || Webb (0–1) || — || 11,830 || 3–6 || W2
|- style="background:#bfb;"
| 10 || April 13 || @ Braves || 14–8 || Curtiss (1–0) || Fried (0–1) || — || 12,036 || 4–6 || W3
|- style="background:#bfb;"
| 11 || April 14 || @ Braves || 6–5  || Curtiss (2–0) || Matzek (0–1) || García (2) || 12,480 || 5–6 || W4
|- style="background:#fbb;"
| 12 || April 15 || @ Braves || 6–7 || Minter (1–0) || Floro (0–1) || — || 11,739 || 5–7 || L1
|- style="background:#bfb;"
| 13 || April 16 || Giants || 4–1 || Bass (1–2) || Wisler (0–2) || García (3) || 5,734 || 6–7 || W1
|- style="background:#bfb;"
| 14 || April 17 || Giants || 7–6  || García (2–1) || García (0–1) || — || 6,014 || 7–7 || W2
|- style="background:#fbb;"
| 15 || April 18 || Giants || 0–1 || Wood (1–0) || López (0–2) || Rogers (1) || 6,129 || 7–8 || L1
|- style="background:#fbb;"
| 16 || April 20 || Orioles || 5–7 || Harvey (1–1) || Neidert (0–1) || Valdez (4) || 4,540 || 7–9 || L2
|- style="background:#bfb;"
| 17 || April 21 || Orioles || 3–0 || Rogers (2–1) || Zimmermann (1–2) || García (4) || 4,028 || 8–9 || W1
|- style="background:#fbb;"
| 18 || April 22 || @ Giants || 0–3 || Sanchez (1–1) || Castano (0–1) || McGee (7) || 4,580 || 8–10 || L1
|- style="background:#fbb;"
| 19 || April 23 || @ Giants || 3–5 || Wood (2–0) || Alcántara (0–2) || — || 6,657 || 8–11 || L2
|- style="background:#bfb;"
| 20 || April 24 || @ Giants || 5–2 || Floro (1–1) || Santos (0–1) || — || 8,282 || 9–11 || W1
|- style="background:#fbb;"
| 21 || April 25 || @ Giants || 3–4 || Webb (1–1) || Campbell (0–1) || Rogers (1) || 7,572 || 9–12 || L1
|- style="background:#bfb;" 
| 22 || April 26 || @ Brewers || 8–0 || Rogers (3–1) || Burnes (2–2) || — || 10,749 || 10–12 || W1
|- style="background:#fbb;" 
| 23 || April 27 || @ Brewers || 4–5 || Houser (2–2) || Curtiss (2–1) || Hader (5) || 10,620 || 10–13 || L1
|- style="background:#bfb;" 
| 24 || April 28 || @ Brewers || 6–2 || Alcántara (1–2) || Godley (0–1) || — || 11,564 || 11–13 || W1
|- style="background:#fbb;" 
| 25 || April 30 || @ Nationals || 1–2  || Hand (2–0) || García (2–2) || — || 8,295 || 11–14 || L1
|-

|- style="background:#fbb;" 
| 26 || May 1 || @ Nationals || 2–7 || Corbin (1–3) || Campbell (0–2) || — || 8,510 || 11–15 || L2
|- style="background:#fbb;"
| 27 || May 2 || @ Nationals || 1–3 || Scherzer (2–2) || Rogers (3–2) || — || 8,482 || 11–16 || L3
|- style="background:#bfb;" 
| 28 || May 4 || Diamondbacks || 9–3 || Bleier (2–0) || Ginkel (0–1) || — || 3,893 || 12–16 || W1
|- style="background:#bfb;" 
| 29 || May 5 || Diamondbacks || 8–0 || Holloway (1–0) || Weaver (1–3) || — || 3,573 || 13–16 || W2
|- style="background:#bfb;" 
| 30 || May 6 || Diamondbacks || 3–1 || Floro (2–1) || Bukauskas (1–1) || García (5) || 4,049 || 14–16 || W3
|- style="background:#bfb;" 
| 31 || May 7 || Brewers || 6–1 || Rogers (4–2) || Suter (2–2) || — || 5,507 || 15–16 || W4
|- style="background:#fbb;" 
| 32 || May 8 || Brewers || 2–6 || Houser (3–3) || Castano (0–2) || — || 5,764 || 15–17 || L1
|- style="background:#fbb;" 
| 33 || May 9 || Brewers || 1–2  || Hader (3–0) || Bass (1–3) || Rasmussen (1) || 5,105 || 15–18 || L2
|- style="background:#fbb;" 
| 34 || May 10 || @ Diamondbacks || 2–5 || Weaver (2–3) || Holloway (1–1) || Crichton (4) || 6,307 || 15–19 || L3
|- style="background:#fbb;" 
| 35 || May 11 || @ Diamondbacks || 3–11 || Bumgarner (4–2) || López (0–3) || — || 5,560 || 15–20 || L4
|- style="background:#bfb;"
| 36 || May 12 || @ Diamondbacks || 3–2 || Poteet (1–0) || Peacock (1–1) || García (6) || 5,714 || 16–20 || W1
|- style="background:#bfb;" 
| 37 || May 13 || @ Diamondbacks || 5–1 || Rogers (5–2) || Kelly (2–4) || — || 5,967 || 17–20 || W2
|- style="background:#fbb;" 
| 38 || May 14 || @ Dodgers || 6–9 || Kershaw (6–3) || Alcántara (1–3) || Jansen (7) || 15,915 || 17–21 || L1
|- style="background:#fbb;" 
| 39 || May 15 || @ Dodgers || 0–7 || Bauer (4–2) || Holloway (1–2) || — || 16,116 || 17–22 || L2
|- style="background:#bfb;" 
| 40 || May 16 || @ Dodgers || 3–2 || López (1–3) || Uceta (0–2) || García (7) || 15,976 || 18–22 || W1
|- style="background:#fbb;" 
| 41 || May 18 || @ Phillies || 3–8 || Bradley (1–1) || Floro (2–2) || — || 11,114 || 18–23 || L1
|- style="background:#bfb;" 
| 42 || May 19 || @ Phillies || 3–1 || Rogers (6–2) || Eflin (2–3) || García (8) || 11,549 || 19–23 || W1
|- style="background:#bfb;" 
| 43 || May 20 || @ Phillies || 6–0 || Alcántara (2–3) || Hale (0–2) || — || 11,503 || 20–23 || W2
|- style="background:#fbb;" 
| 44 || May 21 || Mets || 5–6  || Smith (1–0) || Cimber (0–1) || Barnes (1) || 7,282 || 20–24 || L1
|- style="background:#bfb;" 
| 45 || May 22 || Mets || 3–1 || García (3–2) || Smith (1–1) || — || 7,513 || 21–24 || W1
|- style="background:#bfb;" 
| 46 || May 23 || Mets || 5–1 || Poteet (2–0) || Yamamoto (1–1) || — || 7,945 || 22–24 || W2
|- style="background:#bfb;"
| 47 || May 24 || Phillies || 9–6 || Cimber (1–1) || Eflin (2–4) || Floro (1) || 4,527 || 23–24 || W3
|- style="background:#fbb;"
| 48 || May 25 || Phillies || 0–2 || Velasquez (2–0) || Alcántara (2–4) || Neris (8) || 4,864 || 23–25 || L1
|- style="background:#bfb;"
| 49 || May 26 || Phillies || 4–2 || Detwiler (1–0) || Coonrod (0–1) || García (9) || 4,760 || 24–25 || W1
|- style="background:#fbb;"
| 50 || May 27 || Phillies || 2–3 || Alvarado (4–0) || García (3–3) || Neris (9) || 4,932 || 24–26 || L1
|- style="background:#fbb;" 
| 51 || May 28 || @ Red Sox || 2–5  || Pérez (3–2) || Poteet (2–1) || Ottavino (2) || 9,005 || 24–27 || L2
|- style="background:#fbb;" 
| 52 || May 29 || @ Red Sox || 1–3 || Eovaldi (6–2) || Rogers (6–3) || Barnes (12) || 25,089 || 24–28 || L3
|- style="background:#bbb;"
| — || May 30 || @ Red Sox || colspan=7 | Postponed (rain, Makeup date: June 7)
|-

|- style="background:#fbb;" 
| 53 || June 1 || @ Blue Jays || 1–5 || Ray (3–2) || Alcántara (2–5) || — || 5,321 || 24–29 || L4
|- style="background:#fbb;" 
| 54 || June 2 || @ Blue Jays || 5–6 || Castro (1–1) || García (3–4) || — || 5,385 || 24–30 || L5
|- style="background:#fbb;" 
| 55 || June 3 || @ Pirates || 3–5 || Crick (1–0) || Floro (2–3) || Rodríguez (7) || 4,192 || 24–31 || L6
|- style="background:#fbb;" 
| 56 || June 4 || @ Pirates || 2–9 || Underwood Jr. (2–2) || Poteet (2–2) || Stratton (1) || 8,044 || 24–32 || L7
|- style="background:#fbb;" 
| 57 || June 5 || @ Pirates || 7–8  || Holmes (2–0) || Cimber (1–2) || — || 8,714 || 24–33 || L8
|- style="background:#bfb;" 
| 58 || June 6 || @ Pirates || 3–1 || Alcántara (3–5) || Kuhl (0–3) || García (10) || 5,477 || 25–33 || W1
|- style="background:#fbb;" 
| 59 || June 7 || @ Red Sox || 3–5 || Sawamura (2–0) || Thompson (0–1) || Ottavino (3) || 25,374 || 25–34 || L1
|- style="background:#bfb;" 
| 60 || June 8 || Rockies || 6–2 || López (2–3) || Senzatela (2–6) || — || 4,863 || 26–34 || W1
|- style="background:#fbb;" 
| 61 || June 9 || Rockies || 3–4 || Gomber (5–5) || Garrett (0–1) || Bard (8) || 4,563 || 26–35 || L1
|- style="background:#bfb;" 
| 62 || June 10 || Rockies || 11–4 || Rogers (7–3) || Gonzalez (2–4) || — || 4,965 || 27–35 || W1
|- style="background:#bfb;" 
| 63 || June 11 || Braves || 4–3 || Alcántara (4–5) || Morton (5–3) || García (11) || 6,595 || 28–35 || W2
|- style="background:#bfb;" 
| 64 || June 12 || Braves || 4–2 || Thompson (1–1) || Fried (3–4) || Floro (2) || 8,158 || 29–35 || W3
|- style="background:#fbb;" 
| 65 || June 13 || Braves || 4–6 || Smyly (3–3) || López (2–4) || Smith (12) || 8,448 || 29–36 || L1
|- style="background:#fbb;" 
| 66 || June 14 || @ Cardinals || 2–4 || Gallegos (4–1) || Floro (2–4) || Reyes (17) || 24,281 || 29–37 || L2
|- style="background:#fbb;" 
| 67 || June 15 || @ Cardinals || 1–2 || Reyes (4–2) || García (3–5) || — || 24,736 || 29–38 || L3
|- style="background:#fbb;" 
| 68 || June 16 || @ Cardinals || 0–1 || Helsley (4–4) || Alcántara (4–6) || — || 24,682 || 29–39 || L4
|- style="background:#bfb;" 
| 69 || June 18 || @ Cubs || 10–2 || Curtiss (3–1) || Davies (4–4) || — || 32,505 || 30–39 || W1
|- style="background:#bfb;" 
| 70 || June 19 || @ Cubs || 11–1 || López (3–4) || Arrieta (5–8) || — || 35,846 || 31–39 || W2
|- style="background:#fbb;" 
| 71 || June 20 || @ Cubs || 0–2 || Mills (3–1) || Thompson (1–2) || Kimbrel (20) || 37,158 || 31–40 || L1
|- style="background:#fbb;" 
| 72 || June 22 || Blue Jays || 1–2 || Mayza (2–1) || García (3–6) || Romano (4) || 6,291 || 31–41 || L2
|- style="background:#fbb;" 
| 73 || June 23 || Blue Jays || 1–3 || Ray (5–3) || Rogers (7–4) || Romano (5) || 6,164 || 31–42 || L3
|- style="background:#fbb;" 
| 74 || June 24 || Nationals || 3–7 || Ross (4–7) || Poteet (2–3) || — || 5,255 || 31–43 || L4
|- style="background:#bfb;"  
| 75 || June 25 || Nationals || 11–2 || López (4–4) || Lester (1–3) || — || 4,749 || 32–43 || W1
|- style="background:#bfb;" 
| 76 || June 26 || Nationals || 3–2 || Thompson (2–2) || Corbin (5–6) || García (12) || 6,305 || 33–43 || W2
|- style="background:#fbb;" 
| 77 || June 27 || Nationals || 1–5 || Scherzer (7–4) || Alcántara (4–7) || — || 7,349 || 33–44 || L1
|- style="background:#fbb;" 
| 78 || June 29 || @ Phillies || 3–4 || Velasquez (3–2) || Rogers (7–5) || Alvarado (3) || 18,079 || 33–45 || L2
|- style="background:#bfb;"  
| 79 || June 30 || @ Phillies || 11–6 || Pop (1–0) || Nola (5–5) || — || 17,190 || 34–45 || W1
|-

|- style="background:#bbb;" 
| — || July 1 || @ Phillies || colspan=7 | Postponed (rain, makeup date: July 16)
|- style="background:#fbb;" 
| 80 || July 2 || @ Braves || 0–1 || Smyly (6–3) || López (4–5) || Smith (17) || 38,203 || 34–46 || L1
|- style="background:#bfb;" 
| 81 || July 3 || @ Braves || 3–2 || Alcántara (5–7) || Muller (1–2) || García (13) || 38,526 || 35–46 || W1
|- style="background:#fbb;" 
| 82 || July 4 || @ Braves || 7–8  || Smith (3–5) || Bass (1–4) || — || 34,485 || 35–47 || L1
|- style="background:#bfb;" 
| 83 || July 5 || Dodgers || 5–4 || Hess (1–0) || González (3–1) || Bender (1) || 15,290 || 36–47 || W1
|- style="background:#bfb;" 
| 84 || July 6 || Dodgers || 2–1  || Hess (2–0) || Treinen (2–4) || — || 7,993 || 37–47 || W2
|- style="background:#bfb;" 
| 85 || July 7 || Dodgers || 9–6 || Bender (1–0) || Uceta (0–3) || — || 9,523 || 38–47 || W3
|- style="background:#fbb;"
| 86 || July 8 || Dodgers || 1–6 || Urías (11–3) || Alcántara (5–8) || — || 12,031 || 38–48 || L1
|- style="background:#fbb;" 
| 87 || July 9 || Braves || 0–5 || Morton (8–3) || Bass (1–5) || — || 7,446 || 38–49 || L2
|- style="background:#fbb;" 
| 88 || July 10 || Braves || 4–5 || Fried (6–5) || Rogers (7–6) || Smith (18) || 12,178 || 38–50 || L3
|- style="background:#bfb;" 
| 89 || July 11 || Braves || 7–4 || López (5–5) || Anderson (5–5) || — || 9,456 || 39–50 || W1
|- style="background:#fbb;" 
| 90 || July 16  || @ Phillies || 2–5  || Bradley (4–1) || Alcántara (5–9) || Suárez (3) || N/A || 39–51 || L1
|- style="background:#bfb;" 
| 91 || July 16  || @ Phillies || 7–0  || Holloway (2–2) || Eflin (4–7) || — || 28,712 || 40–51 || W1
|- style="background:#fbb;"
| 92 || July 17/18 || @ Phillies || 2–4  || Alvarado (6–0) || García (3–7) || — || 21,390 || 40–52 || L1
|- style="background:#fbb;" 
| 93 || July 18 || @ Phillies || 4–7 || Wheeler (7–5) || Bender (1–1) || Neris (12) || 20,588 || 40–53 || L2
|- style="background:#fbb;" 
| 94 || July 19 || @ Nationals || 1–18 || Lester (3–4) || Detwiler (1–1) || — || 15,283 || 40–54 || L3
|- style="background:#fbb;" 
| 95 || July 20 || @ Nationals || 3–6 || Finnegan (4–2) || Bleier (2–1) || Hand (20) || 17,362 || 40–55 || L4
|- style="background:#bfb;" 
| 96 || July 21 || @ Nationals || 3–1  || Floro (3–4) || Hand (5–3) || García (14) || 21,058 || 41–55 || W1
|- style="background:#fbb;" 
| 97 || July 22 || Padres || 2–3 || Snell (4–3) || Holloway (2–3) || Melancon (29) || 10,977 || 41–56 || L1
|- style="background:#fbb;" 
| 98 || July 23 || Padres || 2–5 || Musgrove (6–7) || Thompson (2–3) || Melancon (30) || 9,264 || 41–57 || L2
|- style="background:#bfb;" 
| 99 || July 24 || Padres || 3–2 || Garrett (1–1) || Hill (5–5) || García (15) || 13,207 || 42–57 || W1
|- style="background:#bfb;" 
| 100 || July 25 || Padres || 9–3 || Bender (2–1) || Darvish (7–5) || — || 12,765 || 43–57 || W2
|- style="background:#bfb;" 
| 101 || July 27 || @ Orioles || 7–3 || Alcántara (6–9) || Watkins (2–1) || — || 10,098 || 44–57 || W3
|- style="background:#fbb;" 
| 102 || July 28 || @ Orioles || 7–8 || Scott (4–4) || Okert (0–1) || — || 8,363 || 44–58 || L1
|- style="background:#fbb;"
| 103 || July 30 || Yankees || 1–3 || Taillon (7–4) || Thompson (2–4) || Chapman (21) || 18,462 || 44–59 || L2
|- style="background:#fbb;" 
| 104 || July 31 || Yankees || 2–4 || Luetge (4–1) || Hess (2–1) || Loáisiga (3) || 25,767 || 44–60 || L3
|-

|- style="background:#fbb;" 
| 105 || August 1 || Yankees || 1–3 || Rodríguez (2–3) || Bass (1–6) || Chapman (22) || 20,758 || 44–61 || L4
|- style="background:#bfb;" 
| 106 || August 2 || Mets || 6–3 || Luzardo (3–4) || Megill (1–1) || Floro (3) || 8,771 || 45–61 || W1
|- style="background:#bfb;" 
| 107 || August 3 || Mets || 5–4 || Neidert (1–1) || Walker (7–6) || Floro (4) || 7,682 || 46–61 || W2
|- style="background:#fbb;" 
| 108 || August 4 || Mets || 3–5 || Castro (3–3) || Bass (1–7) || May (4) || 9,760 || 46–62 || L1
|- style="background:#bfb;" 
| 109 || August 5 || Mets || 4–2 || Detwiler (2–1) || Familia (5–2) || Bender (2) || 9,745 || 47–62 || W1
|- style="background:#fbb;" 
| 110 || August 6 || @ Rockies || 2–14 || Márquez (10–8) || Alcántara (6–10) || — || 28,281 || 47–63 || L1
|- style="background:#fbb;" 
| 111 || August 7 || @ Rockies || 4–7 || Gomber (9–6) || Luzardo (3–5) || Bard (18) || 39,986 || 47–64 || L2
|- style="background:#fbb;" 
| 112 || August 8 || @ Rockies || 8–13 || Freeland (3–6) || Hess (2–2) || — || 34,677 || 47–65 || L3
|- style="background:#fbb;" 
| 113 || August 9 || @ Padres || 3–8 || Musgrove (8–7) || Thompson (2–5) || — || 26,841 || 47–66 || L4
|- style="background:#fbb;"
| 114 || August 10 || @ Padres || 5–6 || Johnson (3–2) || Bleier (2–2) || Melancon (34) || 32,060 || 47–67 || L5
|- style="background:#bfb;"
| 115 || August 11 || @ Padres || 7–0 || Alcántara (7–10) || Weathers (4–5) || — || 29,753 || 48–67 || W1
|- style="background:#bfb;" 
| 116 || August 13 || Cubs || 14–10 || Luzardo (4–5) || Alzolay (4–13) || — || 11,728 || 49–67 || W2
|- style="background:#bfb;" 
| 117 || August 14 || Cubs || 5–4 || Floro (4–4) || Heuer (4–2) || Bender (3) || 11,225 || 50–67 || W3
|- style="background:#bfb;" 
| 118 || August 15 || Cubs || 4–1 || Campbell (1–2) || Mills (5–5) || Floro (5) || 10,262 || 51–67 || W4
|- style="background:#fbb;" 
| 119 || August 16 || Braves || 2–12 || Toussaint (2–2) || Garrett (1–2) || — || 6,442 || 51–68 || L1
|- style="background:#fbb;" 
| 120 || August 17 || Braves || 0–2 || Martin (2–3) || Alcántara (7–11) || Smith (26) || 6,070 || 51–69 || L2
|- style="background:#fbb;" 
| 121 || August 18 || Braves || 9–11 || Morton (12–4) || Luzardo (4–6) || — || 6,871 || 51–70 || L3
|- style="background:#fbb;" 
| 122 || August 19 || @ Reds || 1–6 || Castillo (7–12) || Neidert (1–2) || — || 11,581 || 51–71 || L4
|- style="background:#fbb;" 
| 123 || August 20 || @ Reds || 3–5 || Gray (5–6) || Hernández (0–1) || Givens (4) || 19,106 || 51–72 || L5
|- style="background:#fbb;" 
| 124 || August 21 || @ Reds || 4–7 || Cessa (4–2) || Bender (2–2) || Lorenzen (2) || 34,433 || 51–73 || L6
|- style="background:#fbb;" 
| 125 || August 22 || @ Reds || 1–3 || Gutierrez (9–4) || Alcántara (7–12) || Lorenzen (3) || 17,797 || 51–74 || L7
|- style="background:#fbb;" 
| 126 || August 24 || Nationals || 1–5 || Fedde (6–8) || Luzardo (4–7) || — || 5,394 || 51–75 || L8
|- style="background:#bfb;" 
| 127 || August 25 || Nationals || 4–3  || Floro (5–4) || Finnegan (4–5) || — || 6,237 || 52–75 || W1
|- style="background:#bfb;"
| 128 || August 26 || Nationals || 7–5 || Hernández (1–1) || Corbin (7–13) || Floro (6) || 5,447 || 53–75 || W2
|- style="background:#fbb;" 
| 129 || August 27 || Reds || 0–6 || Miley (11–4) || Thompson (2–6) || — || 7,119 || 53–76 || L1
|- style="background:#bfb;" 
| 130 || August 28 || Reds || 6–1 || Alcántara (8–12) || Gutierrez (9–5) || — || 10,407 || 54–76 || W1
|- style="background:#bfb;" 
| 131 || August 29 || Reds || 2–1 || Luzardo (5–7) || Mahle (10–5) || Floro (7) || 11,019 || 55–76 || W2
|- style="background:#fbb;" 
| 132 || August 31  || @ Mets || 5–6 || Familia (1–0) || Floro (0–1) || — || 8,199 || 55–77 || L1
|- style="background:#fbb;" 
| 133 || August 31  || @ Mets || 1–3  || Loup (4–0) || Cabrera (0–1) || Díaz (27) || 18,101 || 55–78 || L2
|-

|- style="background:#bbb;"
| – || September 1 || @ Mets || colspan=7 | Postponed (rain, makeup date: September 28)
|- style="background:#fbb;" 
| 134 || September 2 || @ Mets || 3–4 || Familia (9–3) || Alcántara (8–13) || Díaz (28) || 23,737 || 55–79 || L3
|- style="background:#bfb;" 
| 135 || September 3 || Phillies || 10–3 || Okert (1–1) || Gibson (10–6) || — || 7,073 || 56–79 || W1
|- style="background:#bfb;" 
| 136 || September 4 || Phillies || 3–2 || Bass (2–7) || Bradley (7–3) || Floro (8) || 9,256 || 57–79 || W2
|- style="background:#fbb;" 
| 137 || September 5 || Phillies || 3–4  || Kennedy (1–0) || Floro (5–6) || — || 8,082 || 57–80 || L1
|- style="background:#fbb;" 
| 138 || September 7 || Mets || 4–9 || Carrasco (1–2) || Campbell (1–3) || — || 5,848 || 57–81 || L2
|- style="background:#bfb;" 
| 139 || September 8 || Mets || 2–1  || Bender (3–2) || Díaz (5–6) || — || 6,378 || 58–81 || W1
|- style="background:#bfb;" 
| 140 || September 9 || Mets || 3–2 || Bleier (3–2) || Familia (9–4) || Floro (9) || 8,075 || 59–81 || W2
|- style="background:#fbb;" 
| 141 || September 10 || @ Braves || 2–6 || Anderson (7–5) || Rogers (7–7) || — || 33,850 || 59–82 || L1
|- style="background:#bfb;" 
| 142 || September 11 || @ Braves || 6–4 || Bass (3–7) || Rodríguez (4–4) || Floro (10) || 35,250 || 60–82 || W1
|- style="background:#fbb;" 
| 143 || September 12 || @ Braves || 3–5 || Webb (4–2) || Bass (3–8) || Smith (32) || 27,847 || 60–83 || L1
|- style="background:#bfb;" 
| 144 || September 13 || @ Nationals || 3–0 || Alcántara (9–13) || Espino (4–5) || Floro (11) || 19,759 || 61–83 || W1
|- style="background:#fbb;" 
| 145 || September 14 || @ Nationals || 2–8 || Fedde (7–9) || Luzardo (5–8) || — || 17,030 || 61–84 || L1
|- style="background:#bfb;" 
| 146 || September 15 || @ Nationals || 8–6 || Campbell (2–3) || Finnegan (5–7) || Floro (12) || 16,309 || 62–84 || W1
|- style="background:#fbb;" 
| 147 || September 17 || Pirates || 1–2 || Crowe (4–7) || Hernández (1–2) || Stratton (6) || 7,884 || 62–85 || L1
|- style="background:#fbb;" 
| 148 || September 18 || Pirates || 3–6 || Wilson (3–7) || Cabrera (0–2) || — || 12,300 || 62–86 || L2
|- style="background:#bfb;" 
| 149 || September 19 || Pirates || 6–5  || Okert (2–1) || Kuhl (5–7) || — || 9,870 || 63–86 || W1
|- style="background:#bfb;" 
| 150 || September 20 || Nationals || 8–7  || Floro (6–6) || Clay (0–6) || — || 5,383 || 64–86 || W2
|- style="background:#fbb;" 
| 151 || September 21 || Nationals || 1–7 || Rogers (2–0) || Rogers (7–8) || — || 5,926 || 64–87 || L1
|- style="background:#fbb;" 
| 152 || September 22 || Nationals || 5–7 || Gray (1–2) || Hernández (1–3) || Rainey (2) || 5,908 || 64–88 || L2
|- style="background:#fbb;" 
| 153 || September 24 || @ Rays || 0–8 || Yarbrough (9–6) || Cabrera (0–3) || — || 15,340 || 64–89 || L3
|- style="background:#fbb;" 
| 154 || September 25 || @ Rays || 3–7 || McClanahan (10–6) || Alcántara (9–14) || — || 23,783 || 64–90 || L4
|- style="background:#fbb;"
| 155 || September 26 || @ Rays || 2–3 || Baz (2–0) || Luzardo (5–9) || Anderson (1) || 20,826 || 64–91 || L5
|- style="background:#fbb;"
| 156 || September 28  || @ Mets || 2–5  || Stroman (10–13) || Thompson (2–7) || Díaz (31) || N/A || 64–92 || L6
|- style="background:#fbb;" 
| 157 || September 28  || @ Mets || 1–2  || Hand (6–7) || Bass (3–9) || — || 20,647 || 64–93 || L7
|- style="background:#bfb;" 
| 158 || September 29 || @ Mets || 3–2 || Okert (3–1) || Lugo (4–3) || Floro (13) || 22,610 || 65–93 || W1
|- style="background:#fbb;" 
| 159 || September 30 || @ Mets || 3–12 || Hill (7–8) || Guenther (0–1) || — || 24,312 || 65–94 || L1
|- style="background:#fbb;" 
| 160 || October 1 || Phillies || 0–5 || Suárez (8–5) || Alcántara (9–15) || — || 8,469 || 65–95 || L2
|- style="background:#bfb;" 
| 161 || October 2 || Phillies || 3–1 || Luzardo (6–9) || Crouse (0–2) || Floro (14) || 9,655 || 66–95 || W1
|- style="background:#bfb;" 
| 162 || October 3 || Phillies || 5–4 || Zach Thompson (3–7)|| Héctor Neris (4–7)|| Floro (15) || 9,149 || 67–95 || W2
|-

|-
| Legend:       = Win       = Loss       = PostponementBold = Marlins team member

Roster

Farm system

See also

Notes

References

External links 
 2021 Miami Marlins season at Baseball Reference

Miami Marlins season
Miami Marlins
Miami Marlins seasons